John Ivan Laskin (born 1943) is a former justice of the Court of Appeal for Ontario from 1994–2018. He is a graduate of University of Toronto Faculty of Law. Prior to the court he practised law for 23 years.

Laskin is son of former Chief Justice of Canada Bora Laskin. He is married to Crystal Witterick, a former partner at Blake, Cassels & Graydon LLP. Together, they have a daughter.

References

Canadian Jews
Justices of the Court of Appeal for Ontario
Living people
Place of birth missing (living people)
1943 births
Date of birth missing (living people)